The four-man bobsleigh competition at the 2014 Winter Olympics in Sochi, Russia was held at the Sliding Center Sanki near Krasnaya Polyana, Russia on 22–23 February 2014.

On 24 November 2017, the IOC imposed a life ban on bobsledder Alexandr Zubkov. He was stripped of 2 gold medals (two-man and four-man bobsleigh). On November 27 IOC imposed similar sanctions to members of the same team Dmitry Trunenkov and Alexey Negodaylo. On 29 November 2017, IOC also sanctioned Alexander Kasjanov, Ilvir Huzin and Aleksei Pushkarev for doping offences and stripped their team of results. On 18 December 2017, Alexey Voyevoda also received a lifetime ban from the Olympic Games due to doping violations at the 2014 Winter Olympics. The IOC requested that the FIBT modify the results, and the medals were redistributed accordingly.

Records
While the IOC does not consider bobsled times eligible for Olympic records, the FIBT does maintain records for both the start and a complete run at each track it competes.

Qualifying teams
A total of 30 teams from 19 NOCs qualified for the event:
Three teams

Two teams

One team

Results
SR = Start Record TR = Track Record

*Canada 3 crashed in the heat.
**According to run results Cody Sorensen and Ben Coakwell were replaced in run 3 by Luke Demetre and Graeme Rinholm.
*** Poland were disqualified in 2014 after Daniel Zalewski was banned for doping.
**** Russia 1 and Russia 2 were disqualified in 2019 after a review of doping samples which showed that Alexandr Zubkov, Alexander Kasyanov, Aleksei Pushkarev and Ilvir Khuzin had all tested positive for banned substances and were banned until 2020.  On 18 September 2019, NBC Sports and the United States Olympic and Paralympic Committee announced the reallocated silver medals were to be awarded at the 2019 USOPC awards ceremony in Los Angeles.  The reallocated bronze medals were awarded at the 2019 Team GB Ball in London.

References

Bobsleigh at the 2014 Winter Olympics
Men's bobsleigh at the 2014 Winter Olympics
Men's events at the 2014 Winter Olympics